The family de l'Estoile (also spelled as l'Etoile, l'Estoille and Lestoille) was a French family, whose members were noted for their activities in the Safavid Empire (1501-1736). The first known member of the family that moved to Iran was Isaac Boutet de l'Estoille (died 28 July 1667, in New Julfa). He served king Abbas I (r. 1588–1629) as a goldsmith, amongst others.

Notable members
 Isaac Boutet de l'Estoille (died 28 July 1667, New Julfa)
 Louis-Guillherme de l'Estoile (died 16 June 1701, New Julfa)
 Angela de l'Estoille (died 1675)
 André de l'Estoille (died 1745, New Julfa)
 Alexandre de l'Estoille (died 1707, near Bandar Abbas)
 Reine de l’Estoile (died 1766), married to Jacques Rousseau (diplomat)
 Isaac de l'Estoille

Sources